Provorny was a  of the Soviet Navy.

Development and design 

Late 1950s and 1960s - this is an era of great changes in the history of the navy, an era of new opportunities and new weapons. This was primarily due to the emergence of sea-based nuclear missiles, which turned submarines into strategic weapons. The appearance of nuclear power plants on submarines has greatly increased their autonomy, cruising range, underwater speed and, as a consequence, the severity of the threat they create.

From the very beginning, two options for the main power plant were considered - a traditional steam turbine (STU) and a gas turbine (GTU). The latter, due to its lightness and compactness (specific gravity 5.2 kg / l. From. Versus 9 kg / l. From.), Reduced the ship's displacement from 3600 to 3200 tons and increased efficiency. In addition, starting from a cold state took 5–10 minutes for the GTU compared to the several hours required for the STU. For these reasons, the option with gas turbine engines was adopted.

The armament of the new ship was innovative. For the first time in Soviet shipbuilding, it was equipped with two anti-aircraft missile systems (M-1 "Volna"). Each complex consisted of a two-boom launcher ZIF-101, a Yatagan control system and a magazine with two rotating drums for 8 V-600 missiles each.

Construction and career 
Provorny was laid down on 10 February 1961, and launched on 23 March 1962 by 61 Communards Shipyard in Nikolayev. She was commissioned on 25 October 1964.

From 1967 to 1973, the ship twice provided assistance to the Egyptian Armed Forces and the Syrian Armed Forces.

In the period from 2 to 7 July 1973, he visited the French port of Marseille.

On March 22, 1974, Provorny moored at the pier of the 61 Communards plant for overhaul.

From August 22, 1973, to August 27, 1974, the ship was modernized according to Project 61E.

On December 2, 1977, mooring trials began on the ship

In 1981, Provorny made a cruise to the Northern Fleet.

Since 1982, he has been a member of the 70th Brigade of the 30th Division of Anti-submarine Ships.

From March 1, 1987 to March 21, 1988, overhaul began. Then the work was suspended, as the ship had already served its almost 25-year term.

On August 21, 1990, Provorny was removed from the Navy.

On December 31, 1990, Provorny's crew was disbanded.

On February 18, 1993, the ship went to Inkerman for scrap.

Gallery

References 

1962 ships
Cold War destroyers of the Soviet Union
Ships built at Shipyard named after 61 Communards
Kashin-class destroyers